Put Ilyicha is a rural locality (a settlement) and the administrative center of Ilyichyovskoye Rural Settlement, Leninsky District, Volgograd Oblast, Russia. The population was 724 as of 2010. There are 14 streets.

Geography 
Put Ilyicha is located on the Caspian Depression, 50 km northeast of Leninsk (the district's administrative centre) by road. Stepnoy is the nearest rural locality.

References 

Rural localities in Leninsky District, Volgograd Oblast